Forkhead box protein P4 is a protein that in humans is encoded by the FOXP4 gene.

This gene belongs to subfamily P of the forkhead box (FOX) transcription factor family. Forkhead box transcription factors play important roles in the regulation of tissue- and cell type-specific gene transcription during both development and adulthood. Many members of the forkhead box gene family, including members of subfamily P, have roles in mammalian oncogenesis. This gene may play a role in the development of tumors of the kidney and larynx. Alternative splicing of this gene produces multiple transcript variants, some encoding different isoforms.

References

Further reading

Forkhead transcription factors